Jean-Marie Gaspar, usually called only Jean Gaspar (1861–1931) was a Belgian sculptor.

Biography 
Jean Gaspar was born in Arlon, in the Luxembourg province of Belgium. He studied engineering in Liège before deciding to become a sculptor. He was taught sculpting by Jef Lambeaux. He specialised in sculptures depicting animals, including exotic animals which he observed at Antwerp Zoo. Among his works are a sculpture of a deer, and a monument commemorating the dead of World War I, both in his hometown Arlon. Several of his works are also part of the collections of the Royal Museums of Fine Arts of Belgium in Brussels. In Arlon, the Gaspar Museum is devoted to his work and life, and to that of his brother Charles who was a photographer. Jean Gaspar died in Brussels.

References

External links

Belgian sculptors
1861 births
1931 deaths
People from Arlon
19th-century sculptors